Cochylimorpha elongana is a moth of the family Tortricidae. It is found in most of Europe, except Fennoscandia, Ireland, Great Britain, the Baltic region and most of the Balkan Peninsula. It is also found in Asia Minor.

The wingspan is about 17 mm.

The larvae feed on Artemisia campestris, Helichrysum species and Achillea millefolium.

References

 
 

E
Moths of Europe
Moths of the Middle East
Moths of Asia
Moths described in 1839
Taxa named by Josef Emanuel Fischer von Röslerstamm